CSI: NY (Crime Scene Investigation: New York, stylized as CSI: NY/Crime Scene Investigation) is an American police procedural television series that ran on CBS from September 22, 2004, to February 22, 2013, for a total of nine seasons and 197 original episodes. The show follows the investigations of a team of NYPD forensic scientists and police officers identified as "Crime Scene Investigators" (instead of the actual title of "Crime Scene Unit Forensic Technicians" (CSU)) as they unveil the circumstances behind mysterious and unusual deaths, as well as other crimes. The series is an indirect spin-off from the veteran series CSI: Crime Scene Investigation and a direct spin-off from CSI: Miami, during an episode in which several of the CSI: NY characters made their first appearances. It is the third series in the CSI franchise.

Originally in 2004, CSI: NY was produced in partnership with the Canadian media company Alliance Atlantis. The company dissolved after season three in 2007, and all production after that was done under the purview of CBS Paramount Television.

The series was filmed at the CBS Studio Center, with many of the outside scenes shot in and around Los Angeles. Occasionally, scenes were filmed on location in New York City.

The series ended its ninth and final season on February 22, 2013. It was canceled by CBS on May 10, 2013.

Plot 
CSI: NY follows a group of investigators who work for the New York City crime lab. The series mixes gritty subject matter and deduction in the same manner as its predecessors, yet also places a great deal of emphasis on criminal profiling. The team is led by Detective Mac Taylor, a former Marine from Chicago. Mac, a veteran of the NYPD, lost his wife on 9/11, and as such must work to rebuild his personal life while supervising his team. He is organized, efficient, dedicated, and very proper in his management style. Mac's partner is originally Stella Bonasera. Stella is half-Greek, half-Italian, and entirely New York City. She helped Mac through the impact of his wife's death and has been by his side ever since. She is a savvy investigator, yet she often speaks before she thinks. Stella leaves New York to head a crime lab in New Orleans and is replaced by Detective Jo Danville. Jo is a former FBI criminalist and an experienced psychological profiler. She and Mac quickly form a strong friendship and an even stronger working rapport. Jo is still haunted by her ousting from the FBI after blowing the whistle on improper lab procedure, so she works to regain her professional reputation. Together, Mac, Stella, and Jo head an elite team of detectives including Danny Messer, Aiden Burn, and Lindsay Monroe. The team also works alongside CSI Sheldon Hawkes, Detective Don Flack, Medical Examiner Sid Hammerback, and CSI trainee Adam Ross.

Cast and characters

Main characters 

 Mac Taylor (Gary Sinise) is a Detective First Grade and the director of the NYPD crime lab. Born in Chicago, Mac served as a major in the USMC, serving in both the 1983 Beirut barracks bombing and Operation Desert Storm, once saying that he had wanted to serve his country more than anything else in the world. Mac lost his wife, Claire, in the World Trade Center attacks, dates occasionally, and eventually proposes to an old friend, Christine Whitney, in the series finale.
 Stella Bonasera (Melina Kanakaredes) is a half-Greek, half-Italian orphan. She is a Detective First Grade with the NYPD and the Assistant CSI Supervisor of Mac's team. She often speaks before she thinks, leading to numerous complaints being made against her by those suspected of crimes. Always going where she can do the most good, Stella resigns from the NYPD crime lab following the season-six finale to run the NOPD crime lab. (seasons 1–6)
 Danny Messer (Carmine Giovinazzo) is a Detective Third Grade and a Crime Scene Investigator working on Mac's team. Growing up in a family under surveillance Danny formulated his own set of hybrid ethics, blending the world of lawbreakers with the world of lawmakers. He is driven by ethics and one day hopes to run the New York crime lab, at one point taking a promotion to sergeant to put him on track to do so. He develops a romantic relationship with Lindsay Monroe.
 Aiden Burn (Vanessa Ferlito) is a Brooklyn native and a Detective Third Grade assigned to Taylor's team. In the first season she is the newest member of the CSI team, but is just as capable as any of them. She is fired from the crime lab after considering planting evidence on a rape suspect. Aiden goes on to apply for a private investigator's license and continues to investigate this suspect. She is fatally beaten and set on fire as a result, leaving the entire team devastated. During her murder, she was able to leave behind enough evidence to convict her killer. (seasons 1–2; guest star: season 2)
 Sheldon Hawkes, M.D. (Hill Harper) is a medical examiner with the NYC Office of the Chief Medical Examiner (OCME) when the series starts. He was a child prodigy who graduated from college at age 18 and was a board-licensed surgeon by the age of 24 and had several years experience in the emergency room. He left surgery because the pain of losing two patients was too intense. In the second season he becomes a CSI on Mac's team, although he is not a sworn NYPD detective like his colleagues.
 Don Flack (Eddie Cahill) is an NYPD Homicide Detective First Grade who comes from a long line of law enforcement officials. He bridges the gap between old-school NYPD and the new generation of CSI. His techniques are borderline yet effective. Despite being an NYPD strongman Flack is emotionally mature. He is left devastated when girlfriend Detective Jessica Angell is shot and killed on the job. Years later, he begins a relationship with Detective Jamie Lovato.
 Lindsay Monroe-Messer (Anna Belknap) is a Detective Third Grade. She worked as a CSI in Montana and finally realized her dream of moving to a big city like New York. Her northwestern work ethic and willingness to tackle any job is a welcome addition to the team. She develops a romantic relationship with Danny Messer and the two marry in season five. Lindsay is awarded the Police Combat Cross by the NYPD for killing a psychopathic fugitive in her own home. (seasons 2–9)
 Sid Hammerback, M.D. (Robert Joy) is the NYPD's Chief Medical Examiner. He is described as an "off-the-charts genius" who only recently traded in a career as a chef. He has two college-aged daughters and at least two ex-wives. He has a habit of over-talking and over-sharing, but despite any eccentricities on his part, Sid is extremely perceptive and sincerely cares for the well-being of his coworkers. He is diagnosed with cancer in season nine, only telling friend Jo Danville of his diagnosis. (seasons 5–9; recurring: seasons 2–4)
 Adam Ross (A. J. Buckley) is a lab tech originally from Phoenix, Arizona. His specialty is trace evidence. He sometimes accompanies the CSIs to crime scenes to aid in reconstruction or evidence collection. Outside work he dabbles in various subcultures from Second Life gaming to dating a Suicide Girl, and is a textbook modern geek. Stella Bonasera in particular develops a soft spot for the much younger Adam. (seasons 5–9; recurring: seasons 2–4)
 Jo Danville (Sela Ward) is a Detective First Grade, a skilled investigator, an unrivaled criminal profiler, and the most recent assistant supervisor on Mac's team. She was an FBI Supervisory Special Agent in Washington prior to her dismissal after she blew the whistle on a corrupt technician. She has a college-aged son, Tyler, from her previous marriage to a fellow FBI agent, and an adopted daughter, Ellie. (seasons 7–9)

Guest stars

Music
The theme song for CSI: NY was taken from the first verse of The Who's "Baba O'Riley." For season four (and onward), the theme was revamped to be more instrumental, removing the lyrics: "I don't need to fight to prove I'm right. I don't need to be forgiven." The score composer for the series was Bill Brown, who won a BMI Award for season one.

Episodes

Reception

Franchise

Like CSI: Crime Scene Investigation and CSI: Miami, CSI: NY has a  comic book, novels, and a video game based on the show.

Nielsen ratings
Seasonal rankings (based on average total viewers per episode) of CSI: NY on CBS:

Note: Each U.S. network television season generally starts in late September and ends in late May, which coincides with the completion of May sweeps.

Broadcast history

United States
First run – Broadcast on CBS from September 2004 to September 2010 on Wednesdays at 10pm/9c, and from September 2010 to February 2013 on Fridays at 9pm/8c (except for the first two episodes of season 9 which aired at 8pm/7c).
Repeats – Spike TV acquired the rerun rights to CSI: NY in November 2004. Both A&E and Spike TV shared the rerun rights to the crossover episodes (with CSI: Miami) "Felony Flight" and "Manhattan Manhunt". Spike TV began sharing the rights to air CSI: NY with TNT. Spike TV aired the show in the daytime (1–3 p.m.) and early evening (5–7 p.m.), leaving TNT to air the show in primetime.

Australia and New Zealand
In Australia Nine Network aired new episodes of CSI: NY, and repeats were shown on satellite channel TVH!TS (formerly TV1).
In New Zealand the show aired on TV3 Saturdays at 9:30pm, with the final first-run episode of the series broadcast on May 3, 2014.

United Kingdom
First run – Seasons one through eight were aired on Saturday nights at 10pm on Channel 5. The channel moved the show to broadcast at 9pm on Tuesday nights starting July 30, 2013, for the ninth and final season. On October 22, 2013, Channel 5 aired a night of the show spanning from 9 to 11:50pm. From 9 to 10:55pm, the final two episodes aired, concluding both the ninth season and the series. These were followed at 10:55 to 11:50pm by a special screening of the first episode "Blink" to round off the show.
Repeats – Shown on Channel 5, 5USA, CBS Drama, and the former Universal Channel. It was also available on Demand 5, for a week after the Channel 5 broadcast date. Channel 5 aired the newest season starting late July through till the autumn with CSI: Crime Scene Investigation then began its seasonal run in late January or early February of the following year. Channel 5 broadcast the season each week until it reached the last episode, unlike in the U.S. In mid-May 2020 the series began a repeat from the first episode on CBS Justice.

Other releases

Online sales 

All episodes are available to stream on Paramount+.

References

External links

CSI: NY Episode Guide on CSI Files
CSI: New York on The Futon Critic

 
2004 American television series debuts
2013 American television series endings
2000s American crime drama television series
2000s American mystery television series
2000s American police procedural television series
2010s American crime drama television series
2010s American mystery television series
2010s American police procedural television series
American television spin-offs
CBS original programming
Channel 5 (British TV channel) original programming
English-language television shows
Fictional portrayals of the New York City Police Department
Television series by Alliance Atlantis
Television series by CBS Studios
Television series created by Ann Donahue
Television series created by Anthony E. Zuiker
Television series created by Carol Mendelsohn
Television shows adapted into comics
Television shows filmed in Los Angeles
Television shows set in New York City